Isabelle Jarry (born 2 October 1959 in Paris) is a French writer and essayist.

She is a chevalier of the Ordre des Arts et des Lettres.

Works 
1990: Théodore Monod, Paris, Plon, 239 p. 
1990: Mémoires d'un naturaliste voyageur, with Théodore Monod, icon. by Jean-Marc Durou, preface by Jean Rouch, Marseille, Éditions AGEP, series "Mémoires d'aujourd'hui", 180 p.  
1991: Voyage au Ténéré, Paris, 200 p.
1992: L'homme de la passerelle, Paris, Éditions du Seuil, series "Cadre Rouge", 185 p.  Prix du Premier Roman 1992.
1990: L’Archange perdu, Éditions Mercure de France, series "Bleue", 345 p. , Prix Anna de Noailles de l'Académie française (1995)
1993: William Wilson de 1983 à 1993, Paris, Comptoir général d'Édition, 221 p. 
1995: Vingt-trois lettres d'Amérique, Paris, Éditions Fayard, 221 p. 
 - Prix Amerigo Vespucci 1995
1996: Emportez-moi sans me briser, Paris, Éditions Fayard, 312 p. 
1997: La Pluie des mangues. Histoires contemporaines du Cambodge, phot. by Yves Gellie, Paris, Éditions Marval, 180 p. 
1998: Au ciel les nuages. Hommage à Dominique Bagouet, Éditions Marval
1999: Le Jardin Yamata, Paris, Stock, 228 p. 
2000: Il était une fois... l'enfance, photographies du fonds Roger Viollet, Paris, Éditions Plume, 111 p. 
2002: Au Désert, Paris, éditions , 149 p. 
2003: George Orwell, cent ans d'anticipation, Stock, 216 p. 
2004: J’ai nom sans bruit, Stock, series "La Bleue", 210 p. 
2007: Millefeuille de onze ans, Stock, 230 p. 
2008: La Traversée du Désert, Stock, 240 p. 
2009: Contre mes seuls ennemis, Stock, 203 p. 
2011: La Voix des êtres aimés, Stock, series "La Bleue", 304 p. 
2015: Magique aujourd’hui, Éditions Gallimard, "Collection Blanche", 336 p. 

Youth literature

2004: Aglaé en Inde, with William Wilson, Paris, Jalan Publications, 40 p. 
2007: Balthazar au jardin, with William Wilson, Paris, Gallimard Jeunesse, series "Hors série Giboulée", 37 p. 
2008: Ma folle semaine avec Papyrus, ill. by Aurore Callias, Gallimard Jeunesse, series "Giboulées", 101 p. 
2011: Le Bal de la Saint-Valentin : Une aventure de Titus et Papyrus, ill. by Aurore Callias, Gallimard Jeunesse, series "Giboulées", 120 p. 
2011: Zqwick le robot : Une aventure de Titus et Papyrus, ill. d'Aurore Callias, Gallimard Jeunesse, series "Hors série Giboulées", 108 p.

Pocket editions

1994: L’Homme de la passerelle, Points Seuil
1996: L’Archange perdu, Folio Gallimard
1998: Emportez-moi sans me briser, Le Livre de Poche
2001: Le Jardin Yamata, Le Livre de Poche
2006: J’ai nom sans bruit, Folio Gallimard
2008: Millefeuille de onze ans, Folio Gallimard

References

External links 
 Isabelle Jarry on Babelio
 Isabelle Jarry on Éditions Gallimard
 Isabelle Jarry on the site of the Académie française

20th-century French essayists
21st-century French essayists
French children's writers
French women children's writers
20th-century French novelists
21st-century French novelists
20th-century French women writers
21st-century French women writers
Prix du premier roman winners
Chevaliers of the Ordre des Arts et des Lettres
1959 births
Writers from Paris
Living people